Kullervo (sometimes referred to as the Kullervo Symphony), Op. 7, is a five-movement symphonic work for soprano, baritone, male choir, and orchestra written from 1891–1892 by the Finnish composer Jean Sibelius. Movements I, II, and IV are instrumental, whereas III and V feature sung text from Runos XXXV–VI of the Kalevala, Finland's national epic. The piece tells the story of the tragic hero Kullervo, with each movement depicting an episode from his ill-fated life: first, an introduction that establishes the psychology of the titular character; second, a haunting "lullaby with variations" that portrays his unhappy childhood; third, a dramatic dialogue between soloists and chorus in which the hero unknowingly seduces his long-lost sister; fourth, a lively scherzo in which Kullervo seeks redemption on the battlefield; and fifth, a funereal choral finale in which he returns to the spot of his incestuous crime and, guilt-ridden, takes his life by falling on his sword.

The piece premiered on 28 April 1892 in Helsinki with Sibelius conducting the Helsinki Orchestral Association and an amateur choir; the baritone Abraham Ojanperä and the mezzo-soprano Emmy Achté sang the parts of Kullervo and his sister, respectively. The premiere was a resounding success—indeed, the definitive breakthrough of Sibelius's nascent career and the moment at which orchestral music became his chosen medium. The critics praised the confidence and inventiveness of his writing and heralded Kullervo as the dawn of art music that was distinctly Finnish. Sibelius's triumph, however, was due in part to extra-musical considerations: by setting the Finnish-language Kalevala and evoking—but not directly quoting—the melody and rhythm of Finnic rune singing, he had given voice to the political struggle for Finland's independence from Imperial Russia.

After four additional performances—and increasingly tepid reviews—Sibelius withdrew Kullervo in March 1893, saying he wanted to revise it. He never did, and as his idiom evolved beyond national romanticism, he suppressed the work. (However, individual movements were played a few times during his lifetime, most notably the third on 1 March 1935 for the Kalevala centenary.) Kullervo would not receive its next complete performance until 12 June 1958, nine months after Sibelius's death, when his son-in-law Jussi Jalas resurrected it for a recorded, private concert in Helsinki.

Kullervo eschews obvious categorization, in part because of Sibelius's indecision. At the premiere, program and score each listed the piece as a symphonic poem; nevertheless, Sibelius referred to Kullervo as a symphony both while composing the piece and again in retirement when reflecting on his career. Today, many commentators prefer to view Kullervo as a choral symphony, due to its deployment of sonata form in the first movement, its thematic unity, and the presence of recurring material across movements. Such a perspective conceptualizes Kullervo as Sibelius's "Symphony No. 0" and thereby expands his completed contributions to the symphonic canon from seven to eight.

Kullervo has been recorded many times, with Paavo Berglund and the Bournemouth Symphony Orchestra having made the world premiere studio recording in 1970. A typical performance lasts about 70–75 minutes, making it the longest composition in  Sibelius's .

History

Premiere
Preparations for a work as massive as Sibelius's Kullervo stretched Helsinki's musical resources to the limit: the copyists labored to write out the parts, while organizers hired extra musicians because the Helsinki Orchestral Association then consisted of just thirty-eight permanent members. Moreover, the city had no professional chorus, and so about forty amateur vocalists were cobbled together from the University Chorus and the Helsinki Parish Clerk and Organ School's student choir. The rehearsals were also a challenge: the musicians, the majority of whom were Germans, not only viewed Sibelius as a neophyte but also had little understanding of the national heritage upon which Kullervo drew—a few of them even laughed derisively when they saw their parts and when the soloists sang. Speaking a mix of Finnish, Swedish, and German as needed, Sibelius gradually won over his performers through the force of his personality; as one vocalist recalled, "We doubted that we could learn our parts ... [but] the young composer himself would come and hold special rehearsals with us. This raised our self-esteem. And he came. His eyes were ablaze! It was that inspirational fire of which the poets speak".

Kullervo premiered on 28 April 1892 at a sold-out concert audience in the Ceremonial Hall of the Imperial Alexander's University of Finland, Sibelius—initially pale and trembling—conducting. The soloists were the Finnish mezzo-soprano Emmy Achté and baritone Abraham Ojanperä. The audience—a mix of the regular concert-going public and patriots there for the nationalist spectacle—received two leaflets: first, a Swedish-language program that described Kullervo as a "symphonic poem" (""); and second, text in Finnish, (with a Swedish translation) from The Kalevala for Movements III and V, as well as a motto that helped it to contextualize the instrumental Movement IV. Notably, this was the first time in history that a concert audience had been given a Finnish-language text. Although the orchestra overpowered Ojanperä and Achté, the performance was a success: enthusiastic applause erupted after each movement and, at the end, Kajanus presented Sibelius with a blue-and-white-ribboned laurel wreath that quoted prophetically lines 615–616 of Runo L of The Kalevala: "That way now will run the future / On the new course, cleared and ready". The next day, Kullervo received its second performance—again under Sibelius's baton—at a matinée concert, and on 30 April, Kajanus conducted the fourth movement at a popular concert that concluded the season.

Withdrawal and partial suppression
Following the 1892 concerts, Sibelius married Aino on 10 June at the Järnefelt summer home in Tottesund, Vöyri (Vörå), the success of Kullervo having convinced Aino's parents (and Sibelius's mother) that he would be able to provide for their daughter. To satisfy Sibelius's "longing for the wilds", the couple honeymooned in the Karelian village of Lieksa on Lake Pielinen. (Later, Sibelius claimed that  was when he first met Paraske.) Around this time, Sibelius mailed the autograph manuscript of Kullervo to his friend, the Swedish playwright Adolf Paul, in Vienna; they had hoped to interest the Austrian conductor Felix Weingartner in the piece, but nothing came of the plan. On 6, 8, and 12 March 1893, the Orchestral Society again performed Kullervo under Sibelius's baton, with Ojanperä and Achté reprising their roles. Critics received these concerts coolly, faulting the work for its excessive length, jarring dissonances, and inexpert orchestration. Afterwards, Sibelius withdrew Kullervo, saying he wanted to revise it. He did not do so, and as the years ticked by, he focused on other projects, placing Kullervo aside. In 1905, Kajanus borrowed the score for a 5 February performance of Movement IV at a patriotic concert celebrating Runeberg Day.

In 1915, Sibelius wrote to Kajanus asking that he return the autograph manuscript of Kullervo, which was then the only copy. The impetus for this request was two-fold. First, the composer and scholar  had begun writing a Swedish-language biography in honor of Sibelius's semicentennial; to continue the book, he needed to examine the work that had launched Sibelius's career. Second, an 15 August article about Kajanus in Hufvudstadsbladet had listed a 'Kullervo' among his compositions; having likely forgotten that Kajanus indeed had written a piece called Kullervo's Funeral March in 1880, a paranoid Sibelius "jumped to the conclusion" that Kajanus had appropriated Kullervo as his own. Stunningly, Kajanus had mislaid the score following the 1905 concert, and a "nerve-wracking" hunt ensued. When searches of the Helsinki Philharmonic Orchestra and Music Institute libraries proved unsuccessful, a "wholly mystif[ied]" Kajanus began to worry that "some crazy manuscript collector [might] have purloined the score". His patience exhausted, Sibelius in his diary entertained the possibility of conspiracy: "Letter from [Kajanus]. He has not taken the slightest care of Kullervo or—this is more likely—one of the orchestral staff who belongs to the clique around him has burnt it". In December, Kajanus located the manuscript in his personal library.

A decade later, Cecil Gray, Sibelius's first English-language biographer and an advocate in Britain for his music, reported that Sibelius had told him Kullervo would likely remain unrevised:  Nevertheless, in early 1935, as Finland prepared to celebrate the centenary of the Kalevala publication, Armas Väisänen—the ethnomusicologist and general secretary of the festival—secured Sibelius's blessing to have Kullervo third movement performed under the baton of Georg Schnéevoigt. (Väisänen had taken Schnéevoigt to the Helsinki University Library to examine the autograph manuscript; the conductor did not find Kullervo to be on par with Sibelius's mature works, and was only willing to conduct Movement III.) The concert was held on 1 March at the newly-built Messuhalli, which was "filled to the brim". In a review for Helsingin Sanomat,  wrote that, given the caustic receives Kullervo received in 1893, Movement III "surprised and astonished with its clarity, simplicity and subtle beauty". However, he faulted the soloists as woefully unsuitable in terms of timbre and dramatic interpretation: "[they] did not do full justice to the composition".

The final time that any movement of Kullervo was performed during Sibelius's lifetime was in 1955 on the composer's ninetieth birthday, when  conducted the Turku Philharmonic Orchestra in Movement IV. However, in the spring of 1957, just months before his death, Sibelius arranged for bass and orchestra the baritone's concluding monologue—Kullervo's Lament—from Movement III. By this time Sibelius's hand tremor had become so severe that he could not himself write down the notes; instead, he dictated the orchestration to his son-in-law Jussi Jalas. The impetus for returning to Kullervo had been a request by the Finnish bass-baritone Kim Borg for a song from Sibelius. Borg premiered Kullervo's Lament on 14 June in Helsinki during Sibelius Week, Jalas conducting the Finnish Radio Symphony Orchestra.

Posthumous revival

Sibelius died on 20 September 1957. Nine months later, on 12 June 1958, Kullervo received its first complete performance of the twentieth century at a private concert in University Hall, which the Finnish government had organized in honor of the King of Denmark Frederick IX's state visit; the Finnish president Urho Kekkonen was also present. Jalas conducted the Philharmonic Orchestra and Laulu-Miehet, with the baritone Matti Lehtinen and soprano Liisa Linko-Malmio as soloists. The concert was recorded—a first for Kullervo—and a copy was gifted to the Danish king. The next day, as part of Sibelius Week, Jalas repeated Kullervo for a public concert held at Messuhalli. Writing in Helsingin Sanomat,  described Kullervo as "an astonishing leap away from all music that preceded it" with "themes [that] are rather successful, sometimes even ingenious"; nevertheless, he faulted Sibelius for a "scattered ... architecture" and predicted that, while excerpts from Kullervo would be suitable for the concert repertoire, the piece "in its entirety will not become living art".

Two additional productions of Kullervo are also of historical significance. First, the world premiere of Kullervo outside of Finland was on 19 November 1970 in Bournemouth, England, with Paavo Berglund conducting the Bournemouth Symphony Orchestra and the YL Male Voice Choir; the soloists were the baritone  and mezzo-soprano . The next day, Berglund repeated Kullervo at Royal Festival Hall in London. Writing for The Times, William Mann praised Kullervo as  "dramatically gripping", with "choral writing [... that] is stern and monolithic, often powerful, and ... eloquent solos for brother and sister"; he also described Sibelius as "a gifted musical experimenter, with as strong a sense of design as of thematic character". In The Guardian, Edward Greenfield characterized Kullervo as a work of "striking originality" and "Mahlerian scale". Second, on 10 March 1979, Kullervo received its American premiere at Uihlein Hall in Milwaukee, with Kenneth Schermerhorn conducting the Milwaukee Symphony Orchestra and the Wisconsin Conservatory Symphony Chorus; the baritone Vern Shinall and mezzo-soprano Mignon Dunn were the soloists. In a review for The Milwaukee Journal, Roxane Orgill faulted Sibelius as a "longwinded conversationalist" and dismissed Kullervo as having "wander[ed] aimlessly ... it could be argued that the score should never have been dusted off". On 13 April, Schermerhorn's crew (albeit with the West Minster Men's Choir substituting) played Kullervo at Carnegie Hall in New York. In The New York Times, Raymond Ericson found Kullervo "verbose and very uneven. Yet ... it has the unique Sibelius sound, starkly colorful, darkly sonorous ... and the melodic lines have a flavorsome folklike tinge that makes them quite beautiful".

Initially, there was some debate as to the propriety of performing a work that Sibelius withdrew, did not revise, and left unpublished. Santeri Levas, Sibelius's private secretary from 1938–1957, wrote that the Jalas concert was "against the expressed wish of the recently deceased master". Evidence in support of this perspective is that Sibelius regularly denied performance requests. For example, when on 31 August 1950 Olin Downes—the music critic for The New York Times and Sibelius 'apostle'—wrote to the composer to secure Kullervo American premiere, Sibelius refused in a 5 September response. "I still feel deeply for this youthful work of mine", Sibelius explained. "Perhaps that accounts for the fact that I would not like to have it performed abroad during an era that seems to me so very remote from the spirit that Kullervo represents ... I am not certain that the modern public would be able to place it in its proper perspective ... even in my own country I have declined to have it produced". However, Erik Tawaststjerna, Sibelius's most expansive biographer, argued that the posthumous revival of Kullervo "was certainly not in conflict with [Sibelius's] last wishes", as before his death he "reconciled to the idea that the symphony in its entirety might be taken up ... and finally accepted it as something quite natural".

Instrumentation

Kullervo is scored for soprano, baritone, male choir (tenors and baritones), and orchestra. The choir sings in Movements III and V, while the soloists appear in III only. The orchestra includes the following instruments:
Woodwinds: piccolo, 2 flutes, 2 oboes, cor anglais, 2 clarinets (in A and B), bass clarinet (in B), and 2 bassoons
Brass: 4 horns (in D, E, and F), 3–4 trumpets (in D, E, and F), 3 trombones, and tuba
Percussion: timpani, triangle, and cymbals
Strings: violins, violas, cellos, and double basses

Sibelius did not publish Kullervo in his lifetime, and for many decades the score existed only in the autograph original. From 1932–1933, as Finland prepared for the Kalevala 1935 jubilee, Sibelius had the score copied—for his personal use—by the violinist Viktor Halonen. After the composer's death, Breitkopf & Härtel obtained the rights to Kullervo in 1961 and published Halonen's copy (with emendations) five years later. A critical edition of Kullervo, edited by the musicologist Glenda Dawn Goss, arrived in 2005; her work is based on the autograph manuscript, as well as the original orchestral and choral parts (preserved at the Sibelius Museum in Turku) and piano-vocal arrangements of Movements III and V that Sibelius used for rehearsals (preserved at the National Library of Finland in Helsinki, to which his estate transferred in the 1980s).

Structure
Each of the five movements present a part of Kullervo's life, based on the Kullervo cycle from the Kalevala. Movements one, two, and four are instrumental. The third and fifth contain sung dialogue from the epic poem. The work runs over an hour. Some recent recordings range from 70 to 80 minutes.

1. Introduction
This movement evokes the heroic sweep of the legendary Finnish setting, as well as the character Kullervo, a complex, tragic figure.

2. Kullervo's Youth
This movement reflects the sombre tone of Runos 31 through 33 of the Kalevala. Kullervo is marked for tragedy from birth, and spends his youth largely in slavery.

3. Kullervo and His Sister
The baritone and mezzo-soprano represent the protagonist and his sister, while the male chorus set the scene and offer commentary. Kullervo encounters three women and unsuccessfully attempts to seduce them, before succeeding with the third, only to realise too late that she is his long-lost sister. When she learns the truth, she leaps into a stream and drowns. Kullervo laments his crime and his sister's death.

4. Kullervo Goes to Battle
Kullervo attempts to atone for his crime by seeking death on the battlefield.

5. Kullervo's Death
An haunting male chorus recount Kullervo's death. He inadvertently comes to the site where he raped his sister, marked by dead grass and bare Earth where nature refuses to renew itself. He addresses his sword, asking if it is willing to drink guilty blood. The sword answers, and Kullervo falls on his sword.

Analysis

Recategorizing Kullervo as a symphony
Sibelius went on to become one of the most important symphonists of the early twentieth century: his seven numbered symphonies, written between 1899 (the Symphony No. 1 in E minor, Op. 39) and 1924 (the Symphony No. 7 in C major, Op. 105), are the core of his  and stalwarts of the concert repertoire. However, the standard cycle is predated by two projects that Sibelius, during the compositional process, referred to as "symphonies". Second, in 1891 and early 1892, Sibelius continually labeled Kullervo a "symphony" ("") in letters to Aino Järnefelt, Kajanus, and Wegelius, before settling on "symphonic poem" ("") for the April premiere—a title that newspaper advertisements and program shared. Sibelius likely "shrank" from the former classification due both to Kullervo programmatic nature, as well as its deployment of a hybrid structure in which a "quasi-operatic ... " essentially 'interrupts' an up-to-that-point 'normal' work for orchestra. 

Nevertheless, in retirement while reflecting on his career, Sibelius returned to describing Kullervo as a symphony. For instance, in 1945 the City of Loviisa requested Sibelius's blessing for a plaque in his honor that included in its description "[here] Jean Sibelius composed his Kullervo Suite". On 27 February, Sibelius sent the following correction: "Kullervo  (not suite)" (emphasis and underlining in the original). Presumably, had he still considered the work a symphonic poem, he could have written so.
Also, later in life, Sibelius conceded that in fact he had written  symphonies, Kullervo and the Lemminkäinen Suite (Op. 22) inclusive.

The symphonic poem appellation has struck many commentators as ill-fitting; an early example is that, after examining the score in 1915, Furuhjelm re-conceptualized Kullervo as an "epic drama" in two acts (Movements III and V), with two preludes (I and II) and an intermezzo (IV). More commonly, however, scholars have categorized Kullervo as a choral symphony, a descendant of Beethoven's Ninth (1824), Berlioz's Roméo et Juliette (1839), and Liszt's Dante (1856) and Faust (1857), as well as a contemporary of Mahler's Resurrection Symphony (1894). This perspective emphasizes the internal cohesion of the work and its faithfulness to, rather than deviation from, established symphonic practice. As Tawaststjerna has argued:

Similarly, Layton's verdict is that although in Kullervo Sibelius "embraces concepts that, strictly speaking, lie outside the range of the normal classical symphony"—such as Movement III—he does so "without sacrificing [the] essentially organic modes of procedure" that characterize the symphonic process. Goss concurs, writing in the preface to Kullervo complete edition, "The composer's numerous and unequivocal remarks about the music as well as its specific structural features ... leave little doubt that Kullervo is not just Sibelius's first major symphonic work: it is his first symphony", or as Breitkopf & Härtel have since advertised it, a  "Symphony No. 0".

Discography

The Finnish conductor Paavo Berglund and the Bournemouth Symphony Orchestra made the world premiere studio recording in 1970 (1971 release; U.S. distributor: Angel Records SB-3778; U.K. distributor: His Master's Voice SLS 807/2). In an effort to "gain balance" between soloists and orchestra, Berglund—on the "valuable" advice of Jalas—made alterations to the score, correcting what he had perceived to be Sibelius's "impractical orchestration" and "some passages [that were] clumsy or even impossible to play". In Movement III, for example, Berglund swapped out the original orchestration of Kullervo's Lament for Sibelius's 1957 reorchestration, albeit transposed to the original key. Writing for The Musical Times, Hugh Ottaway applauded the recording for its "strong sense of occasion", noting "Berglund's enthusiasm has brought a brilliant, dedicated performance ... [that] could well be a revelation. It is a triumph for all concerned". In 1985, Berglund—now with the Helsinki Philharmonic Orchestra—recorded Kullervo for a second time. 

As of February 2021, Kullervo has been recorded twenty times, the most recent of which dates to August 2018 and is by the Finnish conductor Hannu Lintu and the Finnish Radio Symphony Orchestra. In terms of superlatives, two other Finnish conductors, Leif Segerstam and Osmo Vänskä, as well as Britain's Sir Colin Davis, have since joined Berglund as having recorded the symphony twice. Among vocalists, the Finnish baritone Jorma Hynninen and the Finnish soprano  have sung the roles of Kullervo and Kullervo's sister, respectively, four times; and at six performances, the YL Male Voice Choir holds the record among choirs. Finally, the Helsinki Philharmonic Orchestra, the Finnish Radio Symphony Orchestra, and the London Symphony Orchestra jointly hold orchestra record, at two performances each.

The sortable table below lists all twenty commercially available recordings of Kullervo:

Notes, references, and sources

Notes

References

Sources

Books

Journals and magazines

Newspapers

Liner notes

External links

  Jean Sibelius: The Music – Kullervo

Symphonies by Jean Sibelius
Symphonic poems by Jean Sibelius
1892 compositions
Music based on the Kalevala